Rineloricaria beni is a species of catfish in the family Loricariidae. It is native to South America, where it occurs in the Beni River basin, from which its specific name is derived, in Bolivia. The species reaches 7.8 cm (3.1 inches) in standard length and is believed to be a facultative air-breather. 

Rineloricaria beni sometimes appears in the aquarium trade, where it is often referred to as the dwarf whiptail catfish.

References 

Loricariini
Fish described in 1924
Catfish of South America